Bradford Teaching Hospitals NHS Foundation Trust runs Bradford Royal Infirmary and St Luke's Hospital in Bradford, West Yorkshire, England.

A new ultrasound suite was opened in December 2013 to reduce waiting time for patients needing scans. The suite took three months to complete and has increased the number of scanning rooms from two to five.

In October 2018 it announced that GE Healthcare was building a new command centre at Bradford Royal Infirmary powered by artificial intelligence which is intended to help staff make quick and informed decisions on how to best manage patient care based on streams of real-time data. Such a thing has not been established in Europe before, though there are several in North America.

Performance

In January 2014 Monitor launched an investigation into the Trust, following concerns raised by the Care Quality Commission about accident and emergency staffing levels after an unannounced inspection in September and October 2013 when they found a shortage of nursing staff and senior medical cover especially from midnight and throughout the night.

See also
 List of NHS trusts

References

NHS foundation trusts
Health in Yorkshire